Benedict Peak is a sharp, mostly ice-covered subsidiary peak standing  northeast of the summit of Mount Murphy, in Marie Byrd Land. It was mapped by the United States Geological Survey from surveys and from U.S. Navy air photos, 1959–66, and named by the Advisory Committee on Antarctic Names for Philip C. Benedict, an aurora researcher at Byrd Station in 1966.

References 

Mountains of Marie Byrd Land